Erica Ericsson (born 23 June 1990) is a Swedish footballer midfielder who plays for QBIK.

External links 
 

1990 births
Living people
Swedish women's footballers
Mallbackens IF players
QBIK players
Damallsvenskan players
Women's association football midfielders